The Petroleum Systems Integrity Office is organized within the Division of Oil and Gas, a part of the Alaska Department of Natural Resources. This office was created by Administrative Order #234 on April 18, 2007 by the-then Governor, Sarah Palin.

References
 Alaska DNR, Division of Oil & Gas
 
 

State environmental protection agencies of the United States
2007 establishments in Alaska
Petroleum in Alaska
Government agencies established in 2007